Peltaster is a genus of echinoderms belonging to the family Goniasteridae.

The genus has almost cosmopolitan distribution.

Species:

Peltaster cycloplax 
Peltaster micropeltus 
Peltaster placenta

References

Goniasteridae
Asteroidea genera